Theodor Otto Diener (born 28 February 1921) is a Swiss-American plant pathologist. In 1971, he discovered that the causative agent of the potato spindle tuber disease is not a virus, but a novel agent, which consists solely of a short strand of single-stranded RNA without a protein capsid, eighty times smaller than the smallest viruses. He proposed to name it, and similar agents yet to be discovered, viroids.
Viroids displaced viruses as the smallest known infectious agents.

Biography
Diener was born in Zürich, Switzerland. He attended the Swiss Federal Institute of Technology, from which he graduated with a Dr.sc.nat.ETH degree in 1946. After graduation, he worked as a research assistant at the Swiss Federal Experiment Station for Viticulture and Horticulture at Wädenswil, where he discovered on leaves of a cherry tree the first occurrence in more than 100 years of a rust fungus (Puccinia cerasi), a fungus which is common south of the Alps, but is rarely seen in the north.

In 1949, he emigrated to the United States, where, after a brief tenure at the Rhode Island State College, he accepted a position as Assistant Plant Pathologist at Washington State University's outlying Irrigation Experiment Station in Prosser, where he showed that an unusual amino acid, pipecolic acid, accumulates only in peach leaves bearing symptoms of Western-X-Disease. and that injection of the amino acid into healthy peach seedlings resulted in abnormalities which strikingly resembled disease symptoms, thus indicating that pipecolic acid is intimately associated with the disease's molecular pathogenesis.

In 1959, Diener joined the US Department of Agriculture's Agricultural Research Service Pioneering Laboratory for Plant Virology at the Agricultural Research Center in Beltsville, Maryland, where he investigated the cause of the potato spindle tuber disease. This led to the unexpected discovery of the causative agent, a small RNA molecule, eighty times smaller than the smallest known viruses, for which he proposed the term viroid. Later, viroids were characterized as single stranded covalently closed circular RNA molecules occurring as highly base-paired rod-like structures. Viroids, together with viroid-like satellite RNAs have been officially endorsed by the International Committee for Virus Taxonomy (ICTV) as a novel order of subviral agents, which, in its 2014 publication, encompassed 2 families, 8 genera and 32 species.

In 1989, Diener hypothesized that the unique properties of viroids make them more plausible candidates as "living relics" of a hypothetical, pre-cellular RNA world than are Introns or other RNAs then considered as such. In 2016, Diener reevaluated his hypothesis, with the result that both reviewers agreed that Diener's hypothesis was still valid, but that alternative hypotheses positing a more recent origin of viroids from cellular RNAs needed also to be considered.

Awards and honors
1968: Campbell Award, American Institute of Biological Sciences
1969: Superior Service Award, U.S. Department of Agriculture
1973: Fellow Award; American Phytopathological Society
1975: Alexander von Humboldt Award, Alexander von Humboldt Society
1976: Ruth Allen Award: American Phytopathological Society
1977: Elected Member; U.S. National Academy of Sciences
1978: Elected Fellow, American Academy of Arts and Sciences
1979: Elected Andrew D. White Professor-at-Large, Cornell University
1980: Elected member, Leopoldina, German Academy of Sciences
1987: Wolf Prize in Agriculture, Wolf Foundation/State of Israel
1987: National Medal of Science, USA
1988: E.C. Stakman Award, University of Minnesota
1988: Distinguished Service Award, Potomac Division, American Phytopathological Society
1989: Inducted into Science Hall of Fame, Agricultural Research Service, U.S. Department of Agriculture
1989: Named Distinguished Professor, University of Maryland, College Park, MD
1994: Named Distinguished Professor Emeritus, University of Maryland, College Park, MD
Diener published 2 books on viroids, 120 peer-reviewed articles, 53 chapters in books, and lectured on viroids worldwide

See also
Viroid
Potato spindle tuber viroid

References

 USDA-ARS. 1989. Tracking the Elusive Viroid

1921 births
Living people
American phytopathologists
National Medal of Science laureates
Members of the United States National Academy of Sciences
Wolf Prize in Agriculture laureates
21st-century American botanists
University of Maryland, College Park faculty
Swiss emigrants to the United States